Miss America 2003, the 76th Miss America pageant, was televised live from Boardwalk Hall in Atlantic City, New Jersey on Saturday, September 21, 2002 on the ABC Network.  Erika Harold of Illinois won the pageant.

Results

Placements

Order of announcements

Top 15

Top 10

Top 5

Awards

Quality of Life awards

Delegates

1 Age as of September 2002

Judges
Donna Axum
Jose Feghali
James Matthew Jones
Tamara Haddad
Gwendolyn Calvert Baker
Evan S. Dobelle
Kay Casstevens

References

External links
 Official Results
Miss America Pageant 2003 (September 2002) - YouTube User: PageantsHayDay

2003
2002 in the United States
2003 beauty pageants
2002 in New Jersey
September 2002 events in the United States
Events in Atlantic City, New Jersey